Kosi may refer to:


Places
 Kosi River in Nepal and Bihar, India
 Dudh Kosi River in Nepal, tributary of the Kosi
 Sun Kosi River in Nepal, tributary of the Kosi
 Bhote Kosi River in Nepal, tributary of the Sunkosi
 Kosi division, an administrative division of Bihar state, India
 Kosi Tappu Wildlife Reserve, a wildlife reserve in Nepal
 Kosi Zone, an administrative division of Nepal
 Kosi Bay, a lake system and nature reserve in Maputuland, KwaZulu-Natal, South Africa
 Kosi Kalan, a town in Mathura District, Agra Division, Uttar Pradesh, India

People
 Kosi Saka (1986- ), a Congolese soccer player
 Justin Koschitzke; an Australian rules footballer with the St Kilda Football Club.

Other
 KOSI, an FM radio station (101.1 FM) licensed to serve Denver, Colorado, United States
 KOSI, Kyle of Sutherland Initiative (Highland Scotland development group)

See also
 Koshi (disambiguation)